Asia Muhammad and Maria Sanchez were the defending champions, but lost in the semifinals to Ellen Perez and Arina Rodionova.

Beatriz Haddad Maia and Luisa Stefani won the title, defeating Perez and Rodionova 6–4, 6–7(5–7), [10–4], in the final.

Seeds

Draw

Draw

References

External links
Main Draw

Ilkley Trophy - Doubles